Rhonesboro is an unincorporated community in Upshur County, Texas, United States.

Notable people
Bobby Ray Inman, United States admiral, was born in Rhonesboro.

Notes

Unincorporated communities in Upshur County, Texas
Unincorporated communities in Texas